Vatica coriacea is a tree in the family Dipterocarpaceae, native to Borneo. The specific epithet coriacea means "leathery", referring to the leaves.

Description
The inflorescences bear cream flowers.

Distribution and habitat
Vatica coriacea is endemic to Borneo. Its habitat is kerangas forest.

Conservation
Vatica coriacea has been assessed as near threatened on the IUCN Red List. It is threatened by land conversion for agriculture, logging for its timber and by forest fires and climate change.

References

coriacea
Endemic flora of Borneo
Plants described in 1962